The Colorado Review is a quarterly literary magazine published by the Center for Literary Publishing at Colorado State University.

History and profile
The magazine was established in 1956. It presents the annual Nelligan Prize for Short Fiction. Winners include Emily Bloch (2004), Dylan Landis (2005), Lauren Guza (2006), Thomas Grattan (2007) and Ashley Pankratz (2008).

See also
List of literary magazines

References

External links

Literary magazines published in the United States
Quarterly magazines published in the United States
Colorado State University
Magazines published in Colorado
Magazines established in 1956
Mass media in Fort Collins, Colorado